List of legislations repealed during Modi administration

List

References

Modi administration